Count of Viana (do Alentejo) was a Portuguese title of nobility granted to D. João Afonso Telo, 4th Count of Barcelos and direct cousin of Queen Leonor Teles, by King Ferdinand I of Portugal pursuant to a royal decree dated 13 March 1373.

The first count belonged to one of the most powerful families among the Portuguese nobility and even though he supported Beatrice of Portugal's party during the 1383-1385 Crisis, the county of Viana (do Alentejo) was inherited by his descendants.

List of the Counts of Viana (do Alentejo)
 João Afonso Telo, (c. 1330-1384);
 Pedro de Menezes (c.1370-1437), his grandson, also 1st Count of Vila Real;
 Duarte de Menezes (1414–1464), his natural son, also 2nd Count of Viana (da Foz do Lima)
 Henrique de Menezes (c.1450-1480), his son, also 3rd Count of Viana (da Foz do Lima) and 1st Count of Loulé

See also
Count of Viana (da Foz do Lima)
Count of Loulé
List of countships in Portugal

External links
Genealogy of the Count of Viana (do Alentejo), in Portuguese

Bibliography
"Nobreza de Portugal e Brasil" Vol III, pages 478/480. Published by Zairol, Lda., Lisbon, 1989.

Viana
1373 establishments in Europe
14th-century establishments in Portugal